Sultan Nasser (Arabic:سلطان ناصر) (born 9 April 1990) is an Emirati footballer.

References

External links
Sultan Nasser at Soccerway

1990 births
Living people
Emirati footballers
Association football midfielders
Al Ain FC players
Al-Ittihad Kalba SC players
UAE Pro League players